The Roman Catholic Diocese of Janaúba is a diocese located in the city of Janaúba in the Ecclesiastical province of Montes Claros in Brazil.

History
 July 5, 2000: Established as Diocese of Janaúba from the Diocese of Januária and Diocese of Montes Claros

Leadership
 Bishops of Janaúba (Roman rite), in reverse chronological order
 Bishop Roberto José da Silva (2019.06.12 - )
 Bishop Guerrino Riccardo Brusati (2015.05.27 - 2019.06.12)
 Bishop José Ronaldo Ribeiro (2007.06.06 – 2014.09.24)
 Bishop José Mauro Pereira Bastos, C.P. (2000.07.05 – 2006.04.19), appointed Bishop of Guaxupé, Minas Gerais

References

 GCatholic.org
 Catholic Hierarchy

Roman Catholic dioceses in Brazil
Christian organizations established in 2000
Janaúba, Roman Catholic Diocese of
Roman Catholic dioceses and prelatures established in the 20th century